Peaness are a band from Chester, England formed in 2013. Their all-female line-up is Balla (guitar and vocals), Jess (bass and vocals) and Rach (drums). Their sound has been described as "melodic indie pop", and "shiny shiny pop with an infectious energy and tunes as sharp as their fringes".

Formation and early releases

The band met at University of Chester and formed in 2013. Their name was chosen as a joke. Jess said: "It was a joke name when we started off, and it just stuck because we couldn’t think of anything better or worse. For us, it’s just funny, but for others it’s not, which makes it even funnier.”

Their first release, in 2015, was a four-track EP entitled No Fun. In a positive review, Bearded Magazine said, "An excellent short story done and dusted in an ultra-compact 13 minutes, the set more than sates the appetite before the arrival of full length novel." This was followed in 2016 by the 7-inch single "I'm Not Your Problem"/"Fortune Favours the Bold" on the Canadian label Kingfisher Bluez.

Are You Sure?

In 2017, Peaness released the 10-track EP Are You Sure? on Alcopop! Records, with two of the tracks, "Same Place" and "Seafoam Islands", also featuring on a 7-inch single on Odd Box Records. Are You Sure? Received mostly positive reviews. Invicta Magazine called it "the perfect collection of tracks to soundtrack a summer", while VultureHound said it was "a delightful introduction to one of the UK’s most exciting new bands."

Marc Riley sessions, "Breakfast" and "Kaizen"

In May 2019, Peaness recorded a session for Marc Riley's show on BBC Radio 6 Music. The following month, they released a new song, "Breakfast", on their Bandcamp page. The lyrics are described as "a light-hearted take on Brexit". The video for the song premiered on the UK music website The 405.

In January 2020, the band recorded a second Marc Riley session and announced the release of a new song, "Kaizen", which was available digitally and as a limited edition 7" vinyl single, with "Breakfast" on the b-side.

Discography

Singles and EPs
No Fun cassette EP (Winter Mute, 2015)
"I'm Not Your Problem"/"Fortune Favours the Bold" 7" single (Kingfisher Bluez, 2016)
"Same Place"/"Seafoam Islands" 7" single (Odd Box Records, 2017)
"Breakfast" (2019), digital single
"Kaizen" (2020), digital single
"Kaizen"/"Breakfast" (2020) self-released limited edition 7" single

Albums
 Are You Sure? (Alcopop! Records, 2017)
 World Full Of Worry (2022), Self released CD; limited edition 12" blue vinyl, 12" standard black vinyl

Compilation appearances
 Piccadilly Records Sampler (Piccadilly Records, 2022) - "IRL"

References

External links 

Official website
Bandcamp

British indie pop groups
Musical groups from Cheshire
Musical groups established in 2013
All-female bands
Female-fronted musical groups
English pop punk groups
Alcopop! Records artists